Jonathan Barnes, FBA (born 26 December 1942 in Wenlock, Shropshire) is an English scholar of Aristotelian and ancient philosophy.

Education and career
He was educated at the City of London School and Balliol College, Oxford University.

He taught for 25 years at Oxford University before moving to the University of Geneva.  He was a Fellow of Oriel College, Oxford, 1968–78; a Fellow of Balliol College, Oxford, 1978–94, and has been Emeritus Fellow of Balliol College since 1994.

He was Professor of Ancient Philosophy, Oxford University, 1989–94.

He was Professor of Ancient Philosophy at the University of Geneva 1994–2002.

He taught at the University of Paris-Sorbonne in France, and took his éméritat in 2006.

He was elected a Fellow of the British Academy in 1987.

He is an expert on ancient Greek philosophy, and has edited the two-volume collection of Aristotle's works as well as a number of commentaries on Aristotle, the pre-Socratics and other areas of Greek thought.

He was elected a Foreign Honorary Member of the American Academy of Arts and Sciences in 1999.

He was awarded an honorary doctorate by the Humboldt University of Berlin in 2012.

Family
He married in 1965 and has two daughters.

He is the brother of the novelist Julian Barnes, and he and his family feature in the latter's memoir Nothing to be Frightened Of (2008).

Philosophical views
Barnes holds that our modern notion of the scientific method is "thoroughly Aristotelian."  He emphasizes the point in order to refute empiricists Francis Bacon and John Locke, who thought they were breaking with the Aristotelian tradition.  He claims that the "outrageous" charges against Aristotle were brought by men who did not read Aristotle's own works with sufficient attention and who criticized him for the faults of his successors.

Writings
 The Complete Works of Aristotle, 2 vols, 1984; reprinted with corrections, 1995 (General Editor)
 Posterior Analytics (translation and commentary on Aristotle), (1975) (revised edition, 1994)
 The Ontological Argument (1972)
 Presocratic Philosophers 2 Vols., 1979; 1 vol. revised edition, 1982
 Aristotle (1982)
 The Modes of Scepticism (1985), with Julia Annas
 Early Greek Philosophy (1987)
 The Toils of Scepticism (1990)
 The Cambridge Companion to Aristotle (1995)
 Logic and the Imperial Stoa (1997)

 Porphyry: introduction (2003)
 Truth, etc. (2007)
 Coffee with Aristotle (2008)
 Methods and Metaphysics: Essays in Ancient Philosophy I (2011)
 Logical Matters: Essays in Ancient Philosophy II (2012)
 Proof, Knowledge, and Scepticism: Essays in Ancient Philosophy III (2014)
 Mantissa: Essays in Ancient Philosophy IV (2015)

See also

 List of Old Citizens

References

Sources
 Merritt Moseley, Understanding Julian Barnes, University of South Carolina Press (1997) [This book provides family info on the Barnes family.]

External links
  Bibliography
 Photo

1942 births
English historians of philosophy
English classical scholars
20th-century English philosophers
21st-century English philosophers
British scholars of ancient Greek philosophy
English expatriates in Switzerland
English expatriates in France
Academic staff of the University of Paris
Academic staff of the University of Geneva
Living people
Fellows of the American Academy of Arts and Sciences
Fellows of Balliol College, Oxford
Fellows of the British Academy
People educated at the City of London School
Fellows of Oriel College, Oxford
Classical scholars of the University of Oxford
English male non-fiction writers
Greek–English translators